The 2014 PFF League (PFFL) was the 11th season of the second tier of Pakistani football league system. The season started on 27 November 2014 and concluded on 27 December 2014.

Teams
A total of 30 teams contested the league. 21 teams played via departmental route and 9 played from club route.

Relegation (pre-season)
A total of 6 teams were relegated from 2013–14 Pakistan Premier League (first tier), and therefore, joined the 2014 PFF League. 

Teams relegated from the 2013–14 Pakistan Premier League
 Baloch Nushki
 Habib Bank
 Lyallpur
 Pakistan Navy
 Pak Afghan Clearing
 Zarai Taraqiati

Teams

Club phase

Group stages

Group A

Group B

Group C

Final stage (Club)

Departmental phase

Group stage

Group A

Group B

Group C

Group D

Group E

Group F

Group G

Final stage (Department)

Group 1

Group 2

Play-off final

Pakistan Navy promoted to Pakistan Premier League.

Federation League finals

Statistics

Top goalscorers
.

References

Pakistan Football Federation League seasons
1
Pakistan
Football leagues in Pakistan
Football competitions in Pakistan